The Beersheba shooting may refer to the following events in Beersheba, Israel:

The 2013 Beersheba shooting, a mass shooting in a bank 
The Beersheva bus station shooting of 2015

See also
Beersheba bus bombings of 2004